Elizabeth Cady Stanton House may refer to:

 Elizabeth Cady Stanton House (Tenafly, New Jersey), listed on the NRHP
 Elizabeth Cady Stanton House (Seneca Falls, New York), listed on the NRHP